Tomoe (ともえ) is a Japanese abstract shape that resembles a comma and a common design element in family crests and corporate logos.

Tomoe may also mean:

 Tomoe, a Japanese given name or surname.  It can be used by males or females, but is more commonly used by females.

People

People with the surname
 Yukiko Tomoe (born 1935) Japanese pro-wrestler

People with the given name
Men
Tomoe Zenimoto Hvas (born 2000), a Japanese-Norwegian swimmer

Women
, Japanese ultramarathon runner
, Japanese singer, actress, fashion designer, producer and artist
, a Japanese female samurai
Tomoe Hotta (born 1975), Japanese tennis player.
, Japanese voice actress 
Tomoe Iwata (1904-2018) is a Japanese supercentenarian
, Japanese women's footballer
, Japanese figure skater
, Japanese judoka
, Japanese voice actress 
, Japanese singer and voice actress
, Japanese women's ice hockey player
, Japanese novelist

Fictional characters

From Japanese media
 Hotaru Tomoe/Sailor Saturn, from the Sailor Moon series
 Professor Tomoe, Hotaru's father, from Sailor Moon
 Yukishiro Tomoe, from Rurouni Kenshin
 Tomoe Ame, from Usagi Yojimbo
 Tomoe Marguerite from My-Otome
 Tomoe, a character from Queen's Blade
Tomoe Koga, a character from Rascal Does Not Dream of Bunny Girl Senpai
 Tomoe Tachibana, a surgeon from Trauma Team  
 Tomoe Wajima, a character in the anime/manga Hanasaku Iroha
 Tomoe, the fox yokai in the anime/manga Kamisama Kiss
 Mami Tomoe, a character in the anime/manga Puella Magi Madoka Magica
 Tomoe Udagawa, the drummer for the band 'Afterglow' in BanG Dream!
 Tomoe Enjou, from The Garden of Sinners 
 Tomoe, a character in the light novel/manga/anime Tsukimichi: Moonlit Fantasy

Other uses
 Tomoe Station, Ogaki, Gifu, Japan; a train station
 Tomoe, a song on Smile.dk's 2008 album Party Around the World
Tomoe, the experimental primary school attended by Japanese celebrity Tetsuko Kuroyanagi

See also

 

Japanese unisex given names
Japanese-language surnames